Cura Si Manjakini (Malay: Pedang Cura Si Manjakini, alternatively Mandakini or Mandangkini; Jawi: ڤدڠ چورا سي منجاکيني) is a sword mentioned in the Malay Annals as originally possessed by Sang Sapurba, the legendary ancestor of Malay kings. For hundreds of years, the sword became a symbol of a rightful sovereignty and power in Malay culture. It was first inherited by Sang Nila Utama the founder of Singapura, later by Parameswara the first ruler of Melaka Sultanate, and then by Muzaffar Syah I the first Sultan of Perak. The sword is now a part of the Perak Sultanate's official regalia.

Etymology
The name of the sword has several transliterations depending on the root manuscript. The word cura  is Sanskrit for knife or dagger while Mandakini (sometimes spelled Mandangkini or Manjakini) refers to the Mandakini River. Thus Cura Si Mandakini is generally accepted as meaning "blade of the Mandakini". Another theory interprets the name as coming from the Tamil-Sanskrit curik meaning to cleave, man deriving from mantra, and dakini referring to the mythological figures in Hindu-Buddhist belief.

Legend
Tradition in the Malay Annals hold that the founder of the major line of rulers in the Malay world was a prince named Sang Sapurba who alleged to be the descendant of Alexander The Great with his Indian wife. Sang Sapurba, then known as Sri Nila Pahlawan first revealed himself with his younger brothers, Sri Krishna Pandita and Sri Nila Utama, upon the sacred hill of Seguntang in the hinterland of Palembang. The princes were later descended into the great plain watered by the Palembang river, where Sang Sapurba married Wan Sendari, the daughter of the local chief, Demang Lebar Daun, and was everywhere accepted as ruler of the land. At a later date Sang Sapurba  is said to have crossed the great central range of Sumatra into the Minangkabau Highlands, where one of his warriors, Permasku Mambang, slew the great serpent Saktimuna using the legendary sword, and was made the king of a grateful people and the founder of the long line of Princes of Minangkabau.

References

Bibliography

History of Malaysia
Malayan swords